Wurtsboro Hills is a mountain range in Sullivan County, New York. It is located north-northeast of Wurtsboro. Shawangunk Mountains are located southeast of Wurtsboro Hills.

References

 

Mountains of Sullivan County, New York
Mountains of New York (state)